Samuel Edwin Weir (March 14, 1903 – May 15, 1991) was an American collegiate and professional football player.  He was the first Nebraska Cornhuskers football player elected to the College Football Hall of Fame and is known as one of Nebraska's greatest athletes.  In 2005 the Omaha World-Herald, as part of a series on the 100 Greatest Athletes of Nebraska, named Weir the 19th best athlete in the state's history.

Biography
Born in Superior, Nebraska in 1903, Weir played on the line at Nebraska and was captain of the 1923 team that beat the "Four Horsemen" of the University of Notre Dame. He was elected All-American in 1924 and 1925.

Weir turned down offers to play professionally in Jacksonville in 1925. He went on to play professionally for the Frankford Yellow Jackets of the National Football League (NFL). In 1927, he and several teammates took over the coaching job in mid-season and achieved a 6–9–3 record, as Weir earned All-Pro honors. The following year, Weir coached the team to an 11–3–2 record, good for a second-place league finish.

Weir was a member of Acacia fraternity, and the track and field complex was later named in his honor.

References

External links
 Nebraska profile
 

1903 births
1991 deaths
American football tackles
Frankford Yellow Jackets coaches
Frankford Yellow Jackets players
Nebraska Cornhuskers football coaches
Nebraska Cornhuskers football players
College track and field coaches in the United States
All-American college football players
College Football Hall of Fame inductees
People from Superior, Nebraska
Players of American football from Nebraska
Burials in Nebraska